Alexander Koch (born February 24, 1988) is an American actor. He played the series regular role of Junior Rennie on the CBS drama series Under the Dome, based on the novel by Stephen King. He currently resides in Los Angeles. Alex Koch appears in the fifth season of Lucifer as Ella Lopez's new love interest, Pete Daily. He co-starred in the 2020 meta-thriller 
Black Bear.

Life and career
Koch was born in Grosse Pointe Park, Michigan, to Joseph and Joya Koch. Koch has two older sisters, Ashleigh and Michelle. His father is late Wayne County assistant prosecutor Joseph Koch. "It was kind of my first introduction into acting, because I would go to the courtroom with him and watch him work," recalls Koch of his dad, who died in 2001. "When he was presenting cases and what-not, it was almost as if he was doing monologues".

Koch graduated from Grosse Pointe South High School in 2006. Koch was heavily involved in both local community and high school theater productions.

He attended The Theatre School at DePaul University and immersed himself in productions such as "A Lie of the Mind," "Hair," "Intimate Apparel," "Normal," "Assassins" and "Reefer Madness: The Musical". In 2012 he received his BFA in acting. Koch made his film debut as "Frank" in Eddie O'Keefe's independent short film "The Ghosts". Koch works with music and images when acting. "When I'm working, I like to work with a lot of music. The more I can think of what a character would listen to, the more I feel like I have a place to create from". [Alexander agrees that he's using songs to give him insights into his character and not just to get him into an emotional space]. "I have a record player at home that I usually listen to, but since I've been in Wilmington [North Carolina, where the series is filming], I couldn't bring it with me. When I'm on set, I'm listening through headphones on my computer, just trying to zone in and focus. Britt [Robertson] always makes fun of me about how I'm always in my chair listening to music". He also works with images. "When I'm working, I find images and kind of attach to them. It just makes the dialogue so much stronger if you have a distinct image in your mind".

In his off time, Koch enjoys writing, music, playing the guitar and collecting vinyl records.

Filmography

Film

Television

Music videos

References

External links
 
Alexander Koch on Instagram
 

American male television actors
Male actors from Detroit
DePaul University alumni
Living people
1988 births
People from Grosse Pointe Park, Michigan